is a Japanese voice actress from Kanagawa Prefecture who is affiliated with VIMS. She is known for her roles as Hotaru Kikuchi in The Idolmaster Cinderella Girls, Tamaki Yamazaki in Tamayomi, Rena Kitayama in World's End Harem, and Yutori Kokorogi in Tomodachi Game.

On July 18, 2022, Amano tested positive for COVID-19.

Filmography

TV series
2019
 The Idolmaster Cinderella Girls Theater as Hotaru Shiragiku

2020
 Tamayomi as Tamaki Yamazaki
 Kuma Kuma Kuma Bear as Misana Farrengram

2021
 Tropical-Rouge! Pretty Cure as Shiori Nakagawa

2022
 Miss Kuroitsu from the Monster Development Department as Wolf Bate
 World's End Harem as Rena Kitayama
 Tomodachi Game as Yutori Kokorogi

2023
 Isekai Shōkan wa Nidome Desu as Yūhi

Films
2020
 High School Fleet: The Movie as Tsubame Kawano

Video games
2021
 Arknights as Scene
 A Certain Magical Index: Imaginary Fest as Patricia Birdway

References

External links
Official agency profile 

Living people
Japanese video game actresses
Japanese voice actresses
Voice actresses from Kanagawa Prefecture
Year of birth missing (living people)